Lacrimispora is a genus of bacteria in the family Lachnospiraceae

References

Lachnospiraceae
Taxa described in 2020
Gram-positive bacteria